Departmentalization (or departmentalisation) refers to the process of grouping activities into departments. Division of labour creates specialists who need coordination. This coordination is facilitated by grouping specialists together in departments.

Popular types of departmentalization
 Functional departmentalization - Grouping activities by functions performed. Activities can be grouped according to function (work being done) to pursue economies of scale by placing employees with shared skills and knowledge into departments for example human resources, IT, accounting, manufacturing, logistics, and engineering.  Functional departmentalization can be used in all types of organizations. Group activities in accordance with the function of an enterprise.
 Product departmentalization - Grouping activities by product line. It can also be grouped according to a specific product or service, thus placing all activities related to the product or the service under one manager. Each major product area in the corporation is under the authority of a senior manager who is specialist in, and is responsible for, everything related to the product line.  LA Gear is an example of company that uses product departmentalization.  Its structure is based on its varied product lines which include women’s footwear etc.
 Customer departmentalization - Grouping activities on the basis of common customers or types of customers. Jobs may be grouped according to the type of customer served by the organization. The assumption is that customers in each department have a common set of problems and needs that can best be met by specialists.  The sales  activities in an office supply firm can be broken down into three departments that serve retail, wholesale and government accounts.
 Geographic departmentalization - Grouping activities on the basis of territory. If an organization's customers are geographically dispersed, it can group jobs based on geography.  For example, the organization structure of Coca-Cola has reflected the company’s operation in two broad geographic areas – the North American sector and the international sector, which includes the Pacific Rim, the European Community, Northeast Europe, Africa and Latin America groups.
 Process departmentalization - Grouping activities on the basis of product or service or customer flow. Because each process requires different skills, process departmentalization allows homogeneous activities to be grouped together.  For example, applicants might need to go through several departments, namely validation, licensing and treasury, before receiving a driver’s license.
 Divisional departmentalization - When the firm develops independent lines of business that operate as separate companies, all contributing to the corporation profitability, the design is called divisional departmentalization or (M-FORM). For example, the Limited. Inc., has these divisions: The Limited, Express, Lerner New York, Lane Bryant and Mast Industries.

Owing to the complexity of tasks and the competitive environment in which organisations operate, they often use a combination of the above-mentioned methods in departmentalization.

Some philosophical considerations
As March and Simon (1958) noted when tracing a first approach to departmentalization back to Aristotle (Politics, Book IV, Chap. 15), the problem of distributing work, authority and responsibility throughout an organization is hardly new. In modern times, Gulick and Urwick (1937) were the first to introduce a theory of different departmentalization strategies, which were referred to as departmentalization by purpose and departmentalization by process.
”First [organization by major process] ... by bringing together in a single office a large amount of each kind of work (technologically measured), makes it possible in the most effective divisions of work and specialization. Second, it makes possible also the economies of the maximum use of labor saving machinery and mass production.
... there is danger that an organization erected on the basis of purpose will fail to make use of the most up-to-date technical devices and specialists because ... there may not be enough work of a given technical sort to permit efficient subdivision.
Is there any advantage in placing specialized services like private secretaries or filing in [process departments]? In a very small organization, yes; in a large organization, no. In a small organization, where there is not a full-time job on some days for a secretary, it is better to have a central secretarial pool than to have a private secretary for each man. In a large organization, the reverse is true.” (Gulick & Urwick, 1937)

Studying the above characterizations of the two forms of departmentalization we note that purpose decentralization is concerned with building work around specific products, customers, or geographic locations, while process departmentalization encompasses the efficiency of ”production”. March and Simon (1958) described the basic difference between the two ways of departmentalization as following:
”Process departmentalization generally takes greater advantage of the potentialities for economy of specialization than does purpose departmentalization: purpose departmentalization leads to greater self-containment and lower coordination costs than process departmentalization.”

When taking a closer look at the three ways of departmentalization by purpose–product, customer, and location–we note that there are some specific advantages related to it.

First, self-containment tends to improve the ability for internal coordination within the unit. At the same time, the need for developing and maintaining extensive external coordination mechanisms is reduced.

Second, a clearer focus on the purpose itself–serving a specific customer or market–is enabled. On the other hand, the sense of independence may result in a drift-off from the achievement of the overall objectives of the organization. Therefore, several authors have emphasized the need for establishing control systems that serve the purpose of allowing decentralized decisions, while still aligning all sub-units to the overall goals of the organization (Drucker 1954, Koontz & O’Donnell, 1964).

Departmentalization by process, on the other hand, seeks to benefit from the advantages that are found in high specialization, and tends to be very efficient in some instances. A high degree of specialization leads to the development of proficiency and professional competence, as well as it enables, and implies, the development of centralized control functions.

On the other hand, the problem of aligning individual and organizational goals remains. In addition, in this case, we would also need to consider departmental goals. Also, the high level of specialization is a barrier for the flexible reallocation of resources within the organization, i.e. people can not perform other tasks than those they are working with in their functional occupation. The most common way of process departmentalization is the division of the firm into business functions, such as purchasing, manufacturing, sales, accounting, etc.

Looking at the circumstances encompassing the use of either of the departmentalization strategies, we find that departmentalization by process generally is advantageous in cases of stable environments, while departmentalization by purpose, featuring self-containment and certain amounts of independence, appears to be the appropriate strategy for handling changing or unpredictable circumstances. Alfred Chandler (in: March and Simon, 1958) identified a correlation between the application of purpose departmentalization and the use of a diversification strategy:

”The dominant centralized structure had one basic weakness. A very few men were still entrusted with a great number of complex decisions. ... As long as an enterprise belonged in an industry whose market, sources of raw materials, and production processes remained relatively unchanged, few entrepreneurial decisions have to be reached. In that situation, such a weakness was not critical, but where technology, market, and sources of supplies were changed rapidly, the defect of such a structure became more obvious.”

Recent trends in departmentalization
 The customer departmentalization has become increasingly emphasized.
 Rigid departmentalization is being complemented by the use of teams that cross over traditional departmental lines ("silos").

References
 Drucker, Peter (1954), The Practice of Management, Harper, New York
 Gulick, Luther and Urwick, Lyndall (1937) (eds), Papers on the Science of Administration, Institute of Public Administration, New York
 Koontz, Harold & Cyril O’Donnell (1964), Principles of Management, McGraw-Hill, New York
 March, James G. and Simon, Herbert A. (1958), Organizations, John Wiley & Sons

Organizational structure
Labor